Kim Soon-ok is a female South Korean former international table tennis player.

Table tennis career
Kin Soon-ok won four medals at the World Table Tennis Championships. 

She won a gold medal in the Corbillon Cup (women's team event) at the 1973 World Table Tennis Championships with Chung Hyun-sook, Lee Ailesa and Park Mi-ra for South Korea.  

Two years later she won a silver medal in the team event. During the 1977 World Table Tennis Championships she won another silver team medal and a bronze medal in the women's doubles with Lee Ki Won.

See also
 List of table tennis players
 List of World Table Tennis Championships medalists

References

South Korean female table tennis players
Asian Games medalists in table tennis
Table tennis players at the 1974 Asian Games
Table tennis players at the 1978 Asian Games
Medalists at the 1974 Asian Games
Medalists at the 1978 Asian Games
Asian Games silver medalists for South Korea
Asian Games bronze medalists for South Korea
World Table Tennis Championships medalists
20th-century South Korean women